is a Shingon temple in Yashima, a lava plateau to the northeast of Takamatsu, Kagawa Prefecture, Japan. A branch temple of Ninna-ji in Kyoto, it is the eighty-fourth temple on the Shikoku 88 temple pilgrimage. It is said to have been founded as a Ritsu school temple by Ganjin in 754, and to have been converted by Kōbō Daishi. The 5x5 bay irimoya-zukuri tiled Hondō (1618) has been designated an Important Cultural Property. A Heian period wooden seated statue of Senjū Kannon and the temple bell (1223) are also Important Cultural Properties. There is a museum of temple treasures and items relating to the Battle of Yashima.

See also

 Shikoku 88 temple pilgrimage
 Battle of Yashima
 Yashima no Hage-tanuki

References

Buddhist temples in Kagawa Prefecture
Shingon Buddhism
Buddhist pilgrimage sites in Japan
Important Cultural Properties of Japan